Yuriy Platonov (born  19 July 1945) is a Russian psychologist, professor and rector of St. Petersburg State Institute of Psychology and Social Work.

Biography
Yuriy Platonov was born on July 19, 1945 in Crimean Region, USSR. After graduating from the Faculty of Psychology of Leningrad State University in 1975 he continued to work at the University as a lecturer and head of the department. In 1992 by the initiative of Professor Platonov the City Administration of Saint Petersburg issued decree on establishing a new higher education institution, oriented at providing training in psychological and social work, which later became St. Petersburg State Institute of Psychology and Social Work. Professor Platonov has since remained its rector.

Honours and awards
Honorary figure of Russian Higher Education
Order of Honour (2006) - for the achievements in science and education, and for the years of diligent work.
Order of Merit for the Fatherland 4th class (2011) - for the great achievements in science, education and training of qualified specialists.
 Vice-President of St. Petersburg Psychological Society

Selected publications
 Platonov Y.P. Psikhologicheskiye phenomeny povedeniya personala v gruppakh i organizatsiyakh: v 2kh tomakh. Tom 1.  [Psychological phenomena of staff behavior in groups and organizations: in 2 vol. Vol.1]. St. Petersburg: Rech Publ., 2007. 416 p., in Russian, 
 Platonov Y.P. Psikhoologiya konfliktnogo povedeniya [Psychology of conflict behavior]. St. Petersburg: Rech SPb., 2009. 544 p., in Russian
 Platonov Y.P. Geopolitika v pautine tekhnologiy vlasti [Geopolitics in the web of power technologies]. St. Petersburg: Rech Publ., 2010. 608 p., in Russian, 
 Platonov Y.P. Tekhnologii vlasti: v 2kh tomakh. Tom 1. [Technology of power: in 2 vol. Vol.1]. St. Petersburg: Rech Publ., 2010. 576 p., in Russian, .

References

External links
 Professor Platonov's profile at the web-site of the Graduate School of Management of St. Petersburg State University (in Russian)
 Website of St. Petersburg State Institute of Psychology and Social Work (in Russian)
 St. Petersburg Psychological Society (in Russian)

1945 births
Living people
Psychologists from Saint Petersburg
Saint Petersburg State University alumni